James Mwangi Macharia (born 23 June 1984) is a Kenyan long-distance runner.

He finished seventh at the 2005 World Half Marathon Championships, which was good enough to help Kenya finish fifth in the team competition. He competed in the marathon at the 2007 World Championships, but did not finish the race.

Achievements

Personal bests
 1500 metres - 3:40.00 min (2006)
 3000 metres - 7:56.19 min (2004)
 5000 metres - 13:28.47 min (2004)
 10,000 metres - 27:49.2 min (2009)
 Half marathon - 1:00:34 hrs (2008)
 Marathon - 2:08:20 hrs (2011)

External links
 

1984 births
Living people
Kenyan male long-distance runners
Kenyan male marathon runners